Kyle Wilkie (born 20 February 1991) is a Scottish professional footballer who plays as a midfielder for Gala Fairydean Rovers.

He has previously played youth football in England with Stockport County, before playing senior professional football in Scotland for Hamilton Academical, Greenock Morton, Livingston, Berwick Rangers, East Fife, Airdrieonians and Annan Athletic.

Career
Wilkie graduated from the Stockport County Centre of Excellence, before signing for Hamilton Academical on 19 August 2009. He made his professional debut for Hamilton on 22 August 2009, in a 3–0 loss against Aberdeen. Wilkie left Hamilton at the end of the 2011–12 season.

After the expiry of his contract with Accies, Wilkie joined Greenock Morton on trial. He scored in a reserve match against Port Glasgow Juniors and was expected to sign on 30 July 2012. He signed a one-year contract later that week after impressing in his trial period. Wilkie was released in May 2013.

Wilkie signed a one-year contract with Livingston on 26 July 2013  after a successful trial period with the club. He made his competitive debut for Livingston on 27 July 2013, as a second-half substitute in a Scottish Challenge Cup match against Berwick Rangers. He was released in May 2014.

In August 2014, Wilkie signed for Highland League club Nairn County. He moved on loan to Berwick Rangers in March 2015, until the end of the 2014–15 season.

Wilkie then signed with East Fife for the 2015–16 season. During his first season at the club he won the Scottish League Two Player of the Month award for March 2016 and at the end of the season he was voted into the PFA Scotland League Two Team of the Year.

On 3 July 2018, Wilkie signed for Airdrieonians. After one season at Airdrieonians, Wilkie signed for Scottish League Two club Annan Athletic.

On 9 July 2020, Wilkie was announced as a new signing for East Kilbride.

Wilkie signed for Gala Fairydean Rovers in 2022.

Career statistics

References

1991 births
Living people
Scottish footballers
Footballers from Glasgow
Stockport County F.C. players
Hamilton Academical F.C. players
Greenock Morton F.C. players
Livingston F.C. players
Nairn County F.C. players
Berwick Rangers F.C. players
East Fife F.C. players
Scottish Premier League players
Scottish Football League players
Scottish Professional Football League players
Highland Football League players
Association football midfielders
Airdrieonians F.C. players
Annan Athletic F.C. players
East Kilbride F.C. players
Gala Fairydean Rovers F.C. players